Idemili North is a Local Government Area in Anambra State, south-central Nigeria. Towns that make up the local government are Abacha, Abatete, Eziowelle, Ideani, Nkpor, Obosi, Ogidi, Oraukwu, Uke, Umuoji.

Schools
Here is the list of secondary schools in Idemili North Local Government Area:
 Notre Dame High School, Abatete
 Abanna Secondary School, Abatete
 Community Secondary School, Eziowelle
 Queen of the Rosary Secondary School, Eziowelle
 Community Secondary School, Ideani
 Government Technical College, Nkpor
 Urban Secondary School, Nkpor
 Community Secondary School, Obosi
 Unity Secondary School, Obosi
 Boys’ Secondary School, Ogidi
 Anglican Girls’ Secondary School, Ogidi
 Community Secondary School, Oraukwu
 Oraukwu Grammar School, Oraukwu
 Community Secondary School, Uke
 Mater Amabili Secondary School, Umuoji
 Community Secondary School, Umuoji
 Awada Secondary School, Awada
 Don Bosco Secondary School,(DBSS), Obosi
Ebelechukwu high school, Nkpor

Here is the list of tertiary institutions in Idemili North Local Government Area:
 John Bosco Institute of Technology, (Jobitech), Obosi

References 

government.html LOCAL GOVERNMENT AREAS IN ANAMBRA STATE dated July 21, 2007; accessed October 4, 2007 Website:www.lga.anambrastate.gov.ng

Local Government Areas in Anambra State
Local Government Areas in Igboland